Diego Cardoso Nogueira (born 6 March 1994), known as Diego Cardoso, is a Brazilian professional footballer who plays as a forward for Sampaio Corrêa.

Career

Santos
Born in Ribeirão Preto, São Paulo, Diego Cardoso joined Santos FC's youth setup in 2007, aged 12. He soon earned plaudits for his performances with the under-20's, being the club's top goalscorer with nine goals.

On 21 January 2014 Diego Cardoso made his first-team debut, coming on as a late substitute in a 1-1 away draw against Audax. He scored his first goal on 9 March, the last of a 4–1 home routing over Oeste.

Bragantino (loan)
On 21 August 2015, after appearing rarely, Diego Cardoso was loaned to Bragantino until the end of the season.

Vila Nova (loan)
On 6 January of the following year he moved to fellow Série B team Vila Nova, in a one-year loan deal.

Guarani (loan)
After two years playing in Santos B, on 7 January 2019, Diego Cardoso was loaned to Guarani until the end of the year. A regular starter during the Campeonato Paulista, he lost his starting spot in the Série B.

Botafogo-SP
On 31 December 2019, Diego Cardoso signed a one-year contract with Botafogo-SP, after his deal with Santos expired.

Career statistics

Honours

Club
Santos
Copa do Brasil Sub-20: 2013
Copa São Paulo de Futebol Júnior: 2013, 2014

Country
Brazil U17
South American Under-17 Football Championship: 2011

References

External links
Santos FC profile 

1994 births
Living people
People from Ribeirão Preto
Brazilian footballers
Brazil youth international footballers
Association football forwards
Campeonato Brasileiro Série A players
Campeonato Brasileiro Série B players
Santos FC players
Clube Atlético Bragantino players
Vila Nova Futebol Clube players
Guarani FC players
Botafogo Futebol Clube (SP) players
Operário Ferroviário Esporte Clube players
Associação Desportiva São Caetano players
Footballers from São Paulo (state)